Lord Nicholas Charles Edward Jonathan Windsor (born 25 July 1970) is a relative of the British royal family, youngest child of Prince Edward, Duke of Kent. As a Catholic convert, he has forfeited his right of succession to the throne. Lord Nicholas has voiced strong anti-abortion views.

Early years
Lord Nicholas Windsor was born on 25 July 1970 at King's College Hospital in Denmark Hill, London, to Prince Edward, Duke of Kent and Katharine, Duchess of Kent. He has an older brother, Lord St Andrews, and a sister, Lady Helen Taylor. He was baptised on 11 September 1970 at Windsor Castle. His godparents included Charles III, at the time the Prince of Wales, and Donald Coggan, at the time Archbishop of York and later Archbishop of Canterbury.

Windsor was educated at Westminster Under School and then Harrow School. He later attended Harris Manchester College, Oxford, where he studied theology.

Religion
Windsor's mother, Katharine, Duchess of Kent, had been received into the Catholic Church in 1994, and in 2001, in a private ceremony, Nicholas himself was also received into the Catholic Church. This meant that he forfeited his right of succession to the British throne under the terms of the Act of Settlement 1701.

On 14 July 2011, he became an Honorary Vice-president of the Friends of the Personal Ordinariate of Our Lady of Walsingham, an Anglican Ordinariate within the Catholic Church.

He has voiced strong views on the issue of abortion, which he has stated is, as a societal threat, "worse than al-Qaeda".

Marriage and family
Windsor met his future wife, Paola Doimi de Lupis Frankopan Šubić Zrinski, at a party in New York City in 1999 to mark the Millennium. He became engaged to her in July 2006. Following a civil ceremony on 19 October 2006 in a London register office, the couple had a religious marriage on 4 November 2006 in the Church of St Stephen of the Abyssinians in the Vatican and by the marriage the bride became Lady Nicholas Windsor. As required by the Royal Marriages Act 1772, the Queen of the United Kingdom consented to the marriage. A House of Commons Early Day Motion welcomed "the first overt marriage within the rites of the Catholic Church of a member of the Royal Family since the reign of Queen Mary I, and the first marriage of a member of the Royal Family to take place within the Vatican City State".

Lord and Lady Nicholas Windsor had their first child, a son, Albert Louis Philip Edward Windsor, on 22 September 2007 at the Chelsea and Westminster Hospital, London. Albert is the eighth grandchild for the Duke and Duchess of Kent. The child is the first Windsor to carry the name Albert since King George VI. An Early Day Motion in the House of Commons welcomed the baptism of Albert as the first royal child to be baptised a Catholic since 1688. Albert was baptised on 20 February 2008 in a Catholic ceremony held in the Queen's Chapel adjoining St James's Palace in London.

Lady Nicholas gave birth to the couple's second child, Leopold Ernest Augustus Guelph Windsor, on 8 September 2009 at the Chelsea and Westminster Hospital. Leopold was baptised by Cardinal Angelo Comastri in St. Peter's Basilica in the Vatican on 29 May 2010. A third son, Louis Arthur Nicholas Felix Windsor, was born on 27 May 2014 at the Chelsea and Westminster Hospital, London, and like his brother Albert was baptized with Catholic rites in the Queen's Chapel at St James's Palace in London.

Windsor and his sons are still in the line of succession to the Dukedom of Kent, the inheritance of which is not regulated by the Act of Settlement. He and his sons are third, fourth, fifth and sixth in line of succession to the Dukedom of Kent respectively.

Charity work
In 2011, Windsor was appointed to the Pontifical Academy for Life. He is co-signatory of the San José Articles which are focused on anti-abortion activism.

In 2007, Windsor accepted the invitation to become Patron of Bromley Mind. The position is a public statement of his support for its work, and he makes a practical contribution from time to time by supporting special events and fundraising campaigns.

Windsor has worked for the Refugee Council in London, the DePaul Trust for the homeless and in a school for autistic children. He was a visiting fellow at the Ethics and Public Policy Centre in Washington DC. He is a Trustee of the Catholic National Library UK and The Right to Life Charitable Trust, which focuses on anti-abortion activism. Windsor is the Royal Patron, along with his wife Paola of the Christian Heritage Centre at Stonyhurst, a charitable endeavour to make the historic collections of Stonyhurst College and the story they tell more widely accessible particularly to young people in the surrounding areas.

He wrote for the American journal First Things on the subject of abortion, an article which was entered into the United States Congressional Record by Congressman Chris Smith. He has written in The Daily Telegraph and The Catholic Herald on anti-abortion issues.

Windsor was Chairman of the Dignitatis Humanae Institute between 2011 and 2013.

References

1970 births
Living people
Alumni of Harris Manchester College, Oxford
Converts to Roman Catholicism from Anglicanism
English anti-abortion activists
English Roman Catholics
Nicholas Windsor
People educated at Harrow School
Younger sons of dukes